Division No. 19, Unorganized, or Lake Winnipeg Unorganized, is an unorganized area spanning central Manitoba from east to west, and contains all of Division No. 19 except for First Nations reserves. Unlike in some other provinces, census divisions do not reflect the organization of local government in Manitoba. These areas exist solely for the purposes of statistical analysis and presentation; they have no government of their own.

It has a population of 2,953 as of 2011, and spans an area of 60,410.85 km2.

Unincorporated communities

 Berens River
 Dauphin River
 Fort Alexander
 Little Grand Rapids
 Pine Creek

References

Unorganized areas in Manitoba